Sant Mateu is a town and municipality in eastern Spain, in the province of Castellón, part of the autonomous community of Valencia.

Sights 

The most interesting sights in Sant Mateu are:
Església arxiprestal church building.
Ermita de la Mare de Déu dels Àngels de Sant Mateu located in the Serra de la Vall d'Àngel mountain range east of the town.

References

External links 

 Ajuntament de Sant Mateu
 Paco González Ramírez - País Valencià, poble a poble, comarca a comarca
 Institut Valencià d'Estadística.
 Portal de la Direcció General d'Administració Local de la Generalitat.

Municipalities in the Province of Castellón
Maestrazgo